Russell Mirasty  (born 1956 or 1957) is the 23rd and current lieutenant governor of Saskatchewan. He was appointed by Governor General Julie Payette, on the constitutional advice of the Prime Minister of Canada, Justin Trudeau, on July 17, 2019. Mirasty was sworn in on July 18, filling the vacancy in the position left when W. Thomas Molloy died in office on July 2.

As lieutenant governor, Mirasty is the viceregal representative of Charles III of Canada in Saskatchewan. He was the first Indigenous person appointed to this office.

Personal life
Mirasty is a member of the Lac La Ronge Indian Band. His first language is Cree. His appointment was strongly welcomed by Indigenous leaders in Saskatchewan.

He and his wife Donna have two children. At the time of his appointment, he and his wife lived in La Ronge.

RCMP career
Mirasty served as a member of the Royal Canadian Mounted Police (RCMP) for thirty-six years, from 1976 to 2013. He was one of only two Indigenous cadets in his troop at RCMP Academy, Depot Division. Following graduation, he served in seven of Canada's ten provinces. He also did a work exchange with the Northern Territory Police in Australia. Mirasty served as a volunteer aide-de-camp to previous lieutenant governors of Saskatchewan. He was appointed assistant commissioner and officer commanding, "F" Division in 2010, the first Indigenous RCMP officer to command a division.

After retiring from the RCMP, Mirasty volunteered with a number of community service organizations. He particularly focused on working with Saskatchewan's education system. In 2017, Mirasty was awarded the Meritorious Service Medal.

Honours
Russell Mirasty's full medal entitlement is as follows.

References

Living people
Year of birth missing (living people)
Lieutenant Governors of Saskatchewan
Cree people
Royal Canadian Mounted Police officers
21st-century Canadian politicians
21st-century First Nations people
20th-century First Nations people